Ferdinand Dahl (born 17 July 1998) is a Norwegian freestyle skier.

He competes in the 2017–18 FIS Freestyle Ski World Cup and represented Norway in slopestyle at the 2018 Winter Olympics in PyeongChang, where he qualified for the final along with fellow Norwegian skier, Øystein Bråten.

During the Winter X Games XXIII Dahl took home a bronze medal during the slopestyle event.

References

External links
 
 
 
 
 

1998 births
Living people
Norwegian male freestyle skiers
Freestyle skiers at the 2018 Winter Olympics
Freestyle skiers at the 2022 Winter Olympics
Olympic freestyle skiers of Norway
X Games athletes